USS Curts (FFG-38) was the twenty-ninth ship of the  of guided-missile frigates. She was named for Admiral Maurice Curts (1898–1976). Curts is the first ship of that name in the US Navy.

Ordered from Todd Pacific Shipyards, Los Angeles Division, San Pedro, California on 27 April 1979 as part of the FY79 program, Curts was laid down on 1 July 1981, launched on 6 March 1982, and commissioned on 8 October 1983. She was decommissioned on 25 January 2013.

Service history

1980s 
Curtss early years in commission were focused on anti-submarine warfare (ASW) operations and Curts was the first Pacific Fleet unit with the complete SQQ-89 ASW suite. The ship received the meritorious unit commendation for tactical proficiency in the tracking of Soviet submarines in 1987.

In 1988, Curts received the armed forces expeditionary medal for serving with the  battle group during Operation Earnest Will in the north Arabian Sea and the Gulf of Oman. Additionally, Curts changed homeport to Yokosuka, Japan, becoming one of the first two guided-missile frigates to join the Forward Deployed Naval Force (FDNF). Curts was first to bring SH-60B LAMPS MK III helicopters to Naval Air Facility Atsugi.

Operation Desert Storm 
On 24 January 1991, during Operation Desert Storm, the ship and her embarked navy and army helicopters captured an Iraqi garrison on Qaruh Island in the northern Persian Gulf, taking the island and custody of 51 Iraqi prisoners. Curts destroyed two mines, sank an Iraqi minelayer and provided support to combat helicopter operations during the battle of Bubiyan Island. The ship received the navy unit commendation for her exceptional operational performance.

1990s 
Upon return from combat operations in June 1991, the ship became an important part of Operation Fiery Vigil rescuing numerous refugees to safety when Mount Pinatubo erupted near Subic Bay, Republic of The Philippines.

In 1993, Curts was upgraded with the 4100-ton class modification, extending her stern another  and enhancing her combat capabilities. Curts joined the  Battle Group in 1993 to participate with the Japanese Maritime Self-Defense Force in joint anti-submarine warfare exercise MAREX. Later that year, the ship deployed to the Persian Gulf conducting 89 boardings of merchant vessels in the Red Sea as part of United Nations sanctions enforcement against Iraq. Curts material and operational readiness was rewarded with the battle efficiency award for 1994.

In 1994 "Curts" participated in the RIMPAC 94 exercise and sailed from its homeport in Yokosuka, Japan to Honolulu, Hawaii to participate with International Navies from around the Pacific, including Japan, Korea, Canada and more.

In 1995, Curts participated in major joint exercises with units of the U.S. Navy and Japanese Maritime Self-Defense Force (JMSDF), and later with the navies of Singapore, Malaysia, and Thailand for 1996 cooperation afloat for readiness and training (CARAT 96).

In 1997, after nine years of forward presence as part of the seventh fleet, Curts departed Yokosuka, Japan for a homeport change to San Diego, California and in October 1998 Curts joined the Naval Reserve Force (NRF).

In 1998, Curts deployed to the multi-lateral exercise Teamwork South, where she participated in exercises with navies from the United Kingdom, Colombia, Ecuador, Peru and Chile. Upon completion of Teamwork South, Curts steamed to Hawaii to participate in multi-lateral exercise RIMPAC 98. Curts made national headlines when a Salinas, Ecuador hotel security guard died from injuries he received during a scuffle with a LTJG (pilot) and Senior Chief Petty Officer assigned to HSL-43 embarked on Curts for the deployment. Both men were removed from the ship and returned to the U.S. to face a court martial. https://apnews.com/article/a0ba5b0cdb0987fa91f2bce686082167

In 1999, Curts deployed to counter-narco-terrorism deployment under the direction of Joint Inter-agency Task Force East (now named Joint Interagency Task Force South). In addition to seizing approximately 5 metric tons of cocaine, Curts conducted rare bi-lateral counter-narcotics exercises with the Colombian Navy. After departing a short visit to Aruba Curts responded to a distress call from M/V Olga, north of the Guajira Peninsula. Curts crew were awarded the Humanitarian Service Medal for joint rescue efforts that saved the lives of several Olga crew members. The half-way point of this deployment found Curts celebrating Halloween in Key West, Christmas in St. Thomas and New Years again in Key West, Florida. The timing of this deployment also caused Curts to be the last U.S. warship to transit the Panama Canal under U.S. control in 1999 (ex- was towed through just before Curts transit) and the first to transit it under Panamanian control in 2000.

2000s 
During CARAT cruises in 2001 and 2003, Curts conducted multilateral exercises with the navies of Singapore, Thailand, Brunei, and the Philippines to continue promoting international training and cooperation.

In 2004 Curts again deployed to southern command on a six-month counter-narcotics deployment with Coast Guard Law Enforcement Detachment (LEDET) 105 and received national notoriety for the largest maritime seizure of cocaine (12 tons) in history. The ship received the U.S. Coast Guard Meritorious Unit Commendation for her outstanding performance during deployment.

Curts deployed again in 2006 to counter-narco-terrorism deployment. Although less successful than the 2004 deployment, Curts interdicted three cocaine shipments, totalling in excess of 10 metric tons of cocaine and apprehension and transport of over 50 smugglers.

On 16 February 2007, Curts was awarded the 2006 Battle "E" award.

In 2007 Curts was transferred from Commander Destroyer Squadron One to Commander Destroyer Squadron Nine and incorporated into Carrier Strike Group Nine. In March USS Abraham Lincoln Strike Group (CSG-9) departed for deployment to the 5th Fleet area of operations (Persian Gulf). This marked Curts first Strike Group deployment since transfer to the U.S. Naval Reserve. Curts primarily performed a Critical Infrastructure Protection role by acting as Scene of Action Commander for Oil Platform protection efforts at the Khawar al Amaya and al Basrah oil terminals in the northern Persian Gulf. Curts also conducted bi-lateral exercises with the Malaysian and Pakistani navies during her transit to the Gulf.

Curts was decommissioned on 25 January 2013, and was transferred to the inactive reserves on 27 February.

In December 2012 during the 112th Session of Congress, a transfer-by-grant was proposed. Both vessels were not transferred. The act of approving the transfer of vessels by the United States does not guarantee that the vessels will actually be transferred. As of September 2016, both ships were in reserve at Pearl Harbor and slated to be disposed of as targets.

On 19 September 2020, Curts was sunk during a sinking exercise (SINKEX) in the Pacific Ocean. The SINKEX was part of Exercise Valiant Shield 2020.

References 

Text of the Naval Vessels Transfer Act of 2012

External links 

Official page
MaritimeQuest USS Curts FFG-38 pages
GlobalSecurity.org FFG-38
Southern Swing 1997 Cruise Book (Courtesy of Matt Christisen)
USS Curts Commissioning Booklet (Contributed by DeWayne Gibson)

 

1982 ships
Gulf War ships of the United States
Oliver Hazard Perry-class frigates of the United States Navy
Ships built in Los Angeles
Ships sunk as targets